The Maybank Championship was a professional golf tournament, co-sanctioned by the Asian Tour and the European Tour, that was played annually in Malaysia. The tournament was founded in 2016 by sponsors Maybank, who had previously sponsored the Malaysian Open, with the inaugural tournament played from 18–21 February at Royal Selangor Golf Club in Kuala Lumpur. It had a purse of US$3,000,000.

Since 2017 the Maybank Championship was played at Saujana Golf and Country Club in Kuala Lumpur.

Winners

Notes

References

External links
Coverage on the European Tour's official site
Coverage on the Asian Tour's official site

Former European Tour events
Former Asian Tour events
Golf tournaments in Malaysia
Recurring sporting events established in 2016
2016 establishments in Malaysia
Maybank